The Thatbyinnyu Temple (or "the Omniscient") is a Theravadin Buddhist temple in Bagan (Pagan), Myanmar. The temple is recognized as a monument in the Bagan Archeological Area, a UNESCO World Heritage Site. Completed in 1150–51 during the reign of King Sithu I, the temple reflected the Bagan period's "innovative architectural and artistic creativity" and "an expression of the self-confident Burmese spirit of nationhood."

The temple was badly damaged by the earthquakes of 1975 and 2016. It is undergoing restoration work with Chinese technical and financial assistance; the restoration work is expected to last until about 2028.

Foundation

Just inside the southeastern corner of the old city wall, the Thatbyinnyu Temple was founded by King Sithu I of Bagan Dynasty in 1144/45. According to the royal chronicles, it was the king's second major temple construction after the Shwegugyi Temple, and the king is said to have donated "boatloads of rubies" to both temples.

The temple was constructed during "a period of rededication to Theravada Buddhism and religious scholarship", and construction was completed in 1150/51. (Additional ornamentation work continued on the terraces but was never fully completed. The terraces contain indentations that were meant to hold a series of over 500 ceramic plaques depicting the jataka stories but the plaques apparently were never added.)

Architecture

The Thatbyinnyu is a five-story brick masonry building topped by a sikhara tower with a hti at the pinnacle. "Somewhat similar to" the nearby Ananda Temple in its architectural style, the temple's exterior is covered in white stucco, and its terraces paved in stone. The temple was originally at the center of a walled enclosure, of which only the north gate remains. The east side has a projected  entry hall, while each of the north, south, and west sides has a  protrusion and six entry points.

The temple exterior resembles a series of square "cubes", stacked on top of each other, separated by seven receding terraces. Each corner of the terraces is adorned with stupa obelisks on square bases. It is the tallest temple in Bagan.

The five-story temple served not only as a place of worship but also as a monastery and library. The temple's first and second floors were used as the residence of monks; the third floor was used to hold images; the fourth was used as a library; and the fifth stored relics. The interior of the temple consists of "pointed arches in the spacious hallways and barrel vaults in other areas". Each floor has two tiers of windows, creating a "vibrant and light interior". Murals filled the ceiling. Original murals with the footprints of the Buddha have survived on the ceiling of the western porch.

The temple "reflected the era's innovative architectural and artistic creativity" of the era. Bagan period scholar Paul Strachan calls Thatbyinnyu "an expression of the self-confident Burmese spirit of nationhood."

Recent history
The temple has been hit by two major earthquakes, in 1975 and 2006. The 1975 earthquake left the temple with heavy damage. The top finial of the sikhara, the main Buddha statue on the 3rd floor, and the corner stupas were all damaged. The damages were repaired by 1979, and the structure was further strengthened in the early 1990s. More maintenance work such as waterproofing of terraces and repointing the exterior were undertaken in the 2000s.

The temple was badly damaged after a 6.8 magnitude earthquake hit the Bagan region on 24 August 2016. It was one of the 36 worst-hit structures, and sustained several horizontal and vertical cracks throughout the structure across all floors, and terraces. Masonry works at the bottom were further damaged by rain. The temple's structure was reinforced with Chinese assistance in 2017. In April 2019, a Chinese archaeology team began working on a nine-year project to restore the temple.

On 6 July 2019, the Bagan Archaeological Area became a UNESCO World Heritage Site. The Thatbyinnyu Temple's UNESCO designation is Monument #1597.

Gallery

See also
 List of tallest structures built before the 20th century

Notes

References

Bibliography
 
 
 
 
 
 
 
 
 
 

Buddhist temples in Myanmar
12th-century Buddhist temples
Bagan
Buddhist pilgrimage sites in Myanmar